Ronald Robertson may refer to:

Ronald Robertson (figure skater) (1937–2000), American figure skater
Ronald Robertson (politician) (1920–1998), politician in Manitoba, Canada
Ronald Foote Robertson (1920–1991), British physician